The National Defense Act of 1920 (or Kahn Act) was sponsored by United States Representative Julius Kahn, Republican of California.  This legislation updated the National Defense Act of 1916 to reorganize the United States Army and decentralize the procurement and acquisitions process for equipment, weapons, supplies and vehicles. It was passed by Congress on June 4, 1920.

Reorganization of the Army

Advocated by John McAuley Palmer and other proponents of the National Guard, the legislation established the Army of the United States as an organization of three components: a) the Regular Army, b) the National Guard, and c) the Organized Reserve.  The Organized Reserve included the Officers’ Reserve Corps, Enlisted Reserve Corps and Reserve Officers Training Corps. The act increased the maximum allowed peacetime strength of the Regular Army from 175,000 to 280,000 enlisted men, and of the National Guard to 435,800 enlisted men, with a corresponding number of officers to provide effective command. The Act completely reorganized and strengthened the National Guard.

Effects of Armistice, limited appropriations, and civilian life on implementation

Between November 15, 1918, and November 15, 1919, the Army discharged more than three million men. In February 1919, Congress authorized the Army to maintain a maximum of 175,000 enlisted men as a stopgap figure, and in May 1919, in the midst of demobilization, Congress appropriated enough funds for fiscal year 1920 to pay for an Army of 325,000 men. The Army expected that Congress would, in the future, appropriate yearly funds for an army of about 225,000. By law, all men who had entered the Army after April 1917 had to be discharged (i.e., leaving only about 50,000 men in the Army). This meant that the Army needed to quickly recruit about 125,000 men to maintain an army of 200,000 men.  

In the spring of 1919, voluntary enlistments in the Army, suspended for the duration of the war, were resumed. An intensive recruiting campaign that was the brainchild of the Secretary of War, Newton D. Baker, offered one and three-year enlistments and touted the benefits of the War Department's programs of educational and vocational training for soldiers.  Unfortunately, by the spring of 1920, the strength of the Army began to decline as one-year enlistments, objected to by Army leadership, began to expire and the enthusiasm created by the recruiting campaign began to subside. In spring 1920, the Army launched a new recruiting campaign, which was judged to have "fizzled," but men continued to enlist at a relatively consistent rate. By the end of fiscal year 1920 (June 30, 1920), after the passage of the amendments, the strength of the Army stood at 177,194 men.

In June 1920, both houses of Congress approved military appropriations that would give the Army enough money to maintain 175,000 men; opponents of the bill stated it was in direct conflict with the figures given in the National Defense Act amendments. By the end of 1920, the strength of the Army stood at about 200,000 men. President Woodrow Wilson vetoed the appropriations bill, but Congress overrode him, and Secretary of War Baker halted recruiting in February 1921. On the matter of funds for fiscal year 1922, Daniel R. Anthony, the chair of the House Subcommittee on Army Appropriations, preferred funds for an army of 150,000, while James W. Wadsworth, the chair of the Senate Subcommittee, stuck with the 175,000 figure. The appropriations bill was signed by President Warren G. Harding in June 1921. It mandated the Army swiftly reduce its size, by October 1921; Senator William E. Borah, another member of the Senate subcommittee, warned he would put forth a figure of funds for only 100,000 men for the next fiscal year if Harding objected to the short timetable.

In order to reduce strength, the Army discharged men under the age of eighteen, and men in the continental United States at their own application. Since the National Defense Act amendments set limits on the number of officers for the Army and the number of enlisted men in each grade, over 1,000 officers were involuntary separated. Despite the threat of mass demotions for senior enlisted men, only all "surplus" noncommissioned officers (those above the allowed number in each rank for whom no military occupation could be found) were reduced by one grade. For fiscal year 1923, the House proposed funds for only 115,000 men, while the Senate proposed funds for 140,000 men. A compromise for funds for 125,000 men was worked out, and the Army was forced to begin involuntary demotions of noncommissioned officers. The Pay Readjustment Act of 1922 placed the Army and the Navy under a single pay system for the first time. The flaws in the Act relating to the Army were twofold. Many senior noncommissioned officers, whose new pay grade had kept up with inflation, found themselves demoted to junior NCO status, whose pay in relation to those above them in rank had stagnated. Having chosen to make a career out of the Army and raise families on the additional pay, they now found potential promotions blocked by younger men. Many were forced to leave the Army and return to civilian life, where pay was higher. The second flaw was a reduction in pay for the lowest two grades of enlisted men. Like many of the demoted noncommissioned officers, these "non-career" soldiers, seeing other opportunities, chose to leave the Army and not re-enlist. By October 1922, the Army was slightly below its new authorized strength of 125,000, and in the spring of 1923, three-year enlistments as advocated for by Secretary of War Baker began to expire; another intensive recruiting campaign managed to avoid a major personnel headache for the Army. The Regular Army settled into a period of greatly reduced strength, not exceeding 120,000 men until 1936.

Enhanced National Guard and Reserve role

The 1920 Act strengthened the National Guard and Organized Reserve in several ways.  First, it directed that the Chief of the Militia Bureau be a National Guard officer as a way to better coordinate activities between the Army General Staff and the National Guard.  Second, it permitted National Guard officers to serve on the Army's General Staff, enhancing their training opportunities and experience, and increasing the exposure of regular Army officers to the National Guard.  Third, it required that the Army Staff create joint committees of Guard, Reserve and Regular Army officers when considering actions that would affect the Guard and Reserve, thus giving the Guard and Reserve input into plans and policies that could affect them. The Regular Army Reserve, the most direct reserve force supplementing the Regular Army, was abolished by the National Defense Act of 1920, but was revived in 1938.

Procurement and contracting

The National Defense Act of 1920 also required the Army to conduct studies and planning for wartime mobilization, rather than waiting for war to be declared to begin planning.  This shift to contingency planning and a long-range outlook led to decentralization of the contracting and procurement process, and increased coordination between military leaders and leaders of business and industry.  The need for specialists in procurement and mobilization planning led to the 1924 creation of the Army Industrial College.

Legacy
The 1920 Act was the basis for the Army's organization through World War II, and remained largely in effect until passage of the National Security Act of 1947.

References

20th-century military history of the United States
Political history of the United States
1920 in American law
1920 in military history
United States federal defense and national security legislation